The Cares Trail or Ruta del Cares is one of the most popular trekking paths within the Picos de Europa, the route is situated between the province of León and Asturias, in Spain. It runs from the Asturian village of Puente Poncebos to Posada de Valdeón through Caín in Leon along the Cares Canyon. In the old times, the route was the only way to reach both towns during the snow seasons in the winter.

History
The Cares Trail was first opened in the mountain rock along the Cares river's canyon between the years of 1916 and 1921 to provide maintenance, food and supplies to the hydroelectric powerplant of   Camarmeña - Poncebos; It was later improved and expanded between 1945 and 1950.

Characteristics
The Cares Trail runs in between the Cantabrian Mountains and is referred to as the "Divine Gorge" of the Cares river, It is a pathway at mid-height of approximately 11 kilometers in length. It is considered one of the most beautiful natural sites in  Spain, it runs along caves, bridges and pathways sculpted in the rock.

While the Cares river carves a much longer path across the mountains to flow into the bay of Biscay in the Atlantic Ocean. From south to north it runs through, Valdeón (province of León), Cabrales, Peñamellera Alta and Peñamellera Baja.
The path known in Spanish as the "Ruta del Cares", is an accessible part, through an elevated trail over the river.

The rocks  that form the mountains on both sides of the Defile are made out of grey Limestone. In them there are numerous hollows and caves, some of which have been used as shelter for  sheep that pasture in the nearby fields.

When the route reaches Caín, the Defile opens, and the path continues through a bridge that runs through the town.

Hiking
The spectacular scenery and the moderate slope of the Cares Trail make it ideal to enjoy Hiking along its path. Out of the two million estimated visitors to the Picos de Europa National Park it is estimated that the Cares trail receives approximately 300.000 hikers as it is the most popular within the National Park.  To avoid hiking accidents the use of proper footwear is advised.

See also 

Picos de Europa National Park
Cares River

References

Image Gallery

External links 
 rutadelcares.org
 The Cares Route

Canyons and gorges of Spain
Hiking trails in Spain
Picos de Europa
Geography of Castile and León
Geography of Asturias